Henry James Matthew (15 January 1837 – 2 December 1898) was an eminent British Anglican colonial bishop in the late nineteenth and early twentieth centuries.

Born in Cambridge, Matthew was educated at St Paul's School and  Trinity College, Cambridge. A Chaplain at Simla in 1877, he was appointed Archdeacon of Lahore in 1877. In 1888 he became Bishop of Lahore. An acclaimed preacher, he died in post, in Lahore, in 1898. He had become a Doctor of Divinity (DD).

References

1837 births
1889 deaths
Alumni of Trinity College, Cambridge
19th-century English Anglican priests
Archdeacons of Lahore
Anglican missionaries in Pakistan
Anglican bishops of Lahore
19th-century Anglican bishops in Asia
English Anglican missionaries